The ARIA Digital Album Chart ranks the highest selling legally downloaded music albums within Australia and is provided by the Australian Recording Industry Association.

History
The Digital Album Chart was established in 2009 and first published on 16 November. The chart still runs weekly .

Trivia

Albums with the most weeks at number one
24 Weeks
Adele - 21 (2011/2012)

20 Weeks
Michael Bublé – Christmas (2011-2019)

14 Weeks

Ed Sheeran - ÷ (2017/2018)

13 Weeks

Various artists - The Greatest Showman: Original Motion Picture Soundtrack (2018-2019)

9 weeks
Lady Gaga and Bradley Cooper - A Star Is Born (2018)

8 weeks
Taylor Swift – 1989 (2014/2015)

7 weeks
Adele – 25 (2015-2017)

6 Weeks
Ed Sheeran – X (2014/2015)
Ed Sheeran - + (2011/2012/2013)
Mumford & Sons - Sigh No More (2010)
Eminem - Recovery (2010)

4 weeks
INXS - The Very Best (2014)/(2019)
Eminem - Kamikaze (2018)
Meghan Trainor – Title (2015)
Skrillex - Bangarang (EP) (2012)
Pink - The Truth About Love (2012)
Kanye West - My Beautiful Dark Twisted Fantasy (2010/2011)

3 Weeks
Ed Sheeran - No.6 Collaborations Project (2019)
Billie Eilish - When We All Fall Asleep, Where Do We Go? (2019)
Hilltop Hoods - The Great Expanse (2019)
Taylor Swift - Reputation (2017)
Flume – Skin (2016)
Passenger - All the Little Lights (2013)

Artists with the most weeks at number one

31 weeks
 Adele

28 weeks
 Ed Sheeran

21 weeks
 Michael Bublé

15 weeks
 Taylor Swift

14 weeks
 Eminem

13 weeks
 Lady Gaga

9 weeks
 Bradley Cooper
 Kanye West
 Pink

8 weeks
 Mumford & Sons

6 weeks
 Coldplay
INXS
Hilltop Hoods

5 weeks
 Boy & Bear
 Ariana Grande
 Glee Cast

4 weeks
 Drake 
 Jay-Z
 One Direction

Artists with the most number ones
 Taylor Swift (6)
 Ariana Grande (5)
 Boy & Bear (5)
 Glee Cast (5)
 Eminem (5)
 Kanye West (5)
 Coldplay (4)
 Ed Sheeran (4)
 Hilltop Hoods (4)
 Lady Gaga (4)
 One Direction (4)
 Pink (4)
 The Amity Affliction (3)
 Angus Stone (3)
 Birds of Tokyo (3)
 Blink-182 (3)
 Bliss n Eso (3)
 Bring Me the Horizon (3)
 Drake (3)
 Florence and the Machine (3)
 Foo Fighters (3)
 Hillsong United (3)
 Hillsong Worship (3)
 Jay-Z (3)
 Kendrick Lamar (3)
 Madonna (3)
 Mumford & Sons (3)
 The Weeknd (3)

Albums that returned to number one

2020
Various Artists - Frozen II (soundtrack)

2019
Michael Bublé – Christmas
INXS - The Very Best
Billie Eilish - When We All Fall Asleep, Where Do We Go?
Lady Gaga and Bradley Cooper - A Star Is Born
Various artists - The Greatest Showman: Original Motion Picture Soundtrack

2018
Michael Bublé – Christmas
Lady Gaga and Bradley Cooper - A Star Is Born
Various artists - The Greatest Showman: Original Motion Picture Soundtrack
Ed Sheeran - ÷
Michael Bublé – Christmas

2017
Ed Sheeran - ÷
Various artists - Trolls: Original Motion Picture Soundtrack
Adele - 25

2016
Adele – 25
Rüfüs – Bloom
Beyoncé – Lemonade
Flume – Skin
Various artists – Suicide Squad (soundtrack)
Michael Bublé – Christmas

2015
Taylor Swift – 1989 
Ed Sheeran – X
Meghan Trainor – Title
Adele – 25
Michael Bublé – Christmas

2014
Ed Sheeran – X
Michael Bublé – Christmas

2013
Ed Sheeran - +
Various Artists The Great Gatsby: Music from Baz Luhrmann's Film
Passenger - All the Little Lights
Michael Bublé – Christmas

2012
Adele - 21
Skrillex - Bangarang (EP)
Ed Sheeran - + 
Lana Del Rey - Born to Die
Pink - The Truth About Love 
Michael Bublé – Christmas

2011
Kanye West - My Beautiful Dark Twisted Fantasy
Adele - 21

2010
Mumford & Sons - Sigh No More
Eminem - Recovery
Angus & Julia Stone - Down the Way
Kanye West - My Beautiful Dark Twisted Fantasy

2009
Susan Boyle - I Dreamed a Dream

See also

ARIA Digital Track Chart

References

Australian record charts